Voivod Lives is the first full-length live album, and twelfth album overall, by Canadian heavy metal band Voivod. It was released in 2000 on Century Media Records in Europe and Metal Blade Records in the US. The US edition features two bonus tracks recorded in 1999 for a broadcasting on the Swedish Sveriges Radio.

Track listing

Personnel
Voivod
Eric Forrest - bass guitar, vocals
Denis D'Amour - guitar
Michel Langevin - drums, artwork

Production
Pierre Rémillard - mixing on tracks 1-4
Eric Ranzenhofer - mixing on tracks 5-8
Bruno Beauregard - mixing assistant on tracks 5-8
Rod Shearer - mixing on tracks 9-11
Helena "Nenne" Zetterberg - producer on tracks 12-13
Jan Waldenmark, Staffan Schoier - engineers on tracks 12-13

References

Voivod (band) albums
2000 live albums
Metal Blade Records live albums
Century Media Records live albums